Welcome is a band from Seattle.

Discography 
 Sirs (Fat Cat Records)
 Sun as Night Light (RX Remedy)
 Six Songs on a CD (RX Remedy)
 Stoma 7" (RX Remedy)
 Split 7" with Mars Accelerator

References

External links
 Welcome on Myspace
 Welcome on Fat Cat Records site

Musical groups from Washington (state)